Sergei Nikolayevich Polstyanov (born 12 April 1967 in Zolotoye Pole, Crimea) is a Russian professional football coach and a former player.  He made his professional debut in the Soviet Top League in 1989 for FC Rotor Volgograd. He played 2 games and scored 1 goal in the UEFA Cup 1994–95 for FC Tekstilshchik Kamyshin.

References

1967 births
Living people
People from Kirovske Raion
Soviet footballers
Russian footballers
Russian expatriate footballers
Expatriate footballers in Ukraine
Russian Premier League players
Ukrainian Premier League players
FC Rotor Volgograd players
SC Tavriya Simferopol players
MFC Mykolaiv players
FC Tekstilshchik Kamyshin players
FC Tyumen players
Russian football managers
FC Tekstilshchik Kamyshin managers
FC Metallurg Lipetsk players
FC Kristall Smolensk players
Association football forwards
FC Energiya Volzhsky players